The Kauffmann–White classification or Kauffmann and White classification scheme is a system that classifies the genus Salmonella into serotypes, based on surface antigens. It is named after Philip Bruce White and Fritz Kauffmann. First the "O" antigen type is determined based on oligosaccharides associated with lipopolysaccharide. Then the "H" antigen is determined based on flagellar proteins (H is short for the German Hauch meaning "breath" or "mist"; O stands for German ohne meaning "without"). Since Salmonella typically exhibit phase variation between two motile phenotypes, different "H" antigens may be expressed. Salmonella that can express only one "H" antigen phase consequently have motile and non-motile phenotypes and are termed monophasic, whilst isolates that lack any "H" antigen expression are termed non-motile.  Pathogenic strains of Salmonella Typhi, Salmonella Paratyphi C, and Salmonella Dublin carry the capsular "Vi" antigen (Vi for virulence), which is a special subtype of the capsule's K antigen (from the German word Kapsel meaning capsule).

Kauffmann–White classification for Salmonella

Salmonella (species) serotype (O antigen) : (H1 antigen) : (H2 antigen)

Examples
Salmonella enterica serotype Typhimurium 1,4,5,12:i:1,2

monophasic variant of Salmonella Typhimurium 1,4,5,12:i:-

 Antigens in brackets are those that are rarely expressed in that serovar.

The cost of maintaining a full set of antisera precludes all but reference laboratories from performing a complete serological identification of salmonella isolates.  Most laboratories stock only a limited range of antisera, and the choice of stock sera is largely determined by the nature of the specimens to be processed.

Representative stock of antisera
A common set of working antisera is shown below:

Laboratories that are likely to investigate typhoid also carry antiserum raised against the Vi antigen.

A set of "Rapid Diagnostic Sera" is also held and is used for determination of common specific H-antigens except i-H.   After obtaining a positive agglutination with the polyvalent-H specific and non-specific antiserum, the three RDS antisera are used to identify the H antigen present.  Depending on the pattern of positive and negative reactions with the RDS antisera, the specific H antigen may be identified:

E = polyvalent for eh, enx, etc.
G = polyvalent for gm, gp, etc.
L = polyvalent for lv, lw, etc.

Connection of O and H symbols to the work of Weil and Felix

This use of the O and H symbols is based on the historic observations of Edmund Weil (1879–1922) and Arthur Felix (1887–1956) of a thin surface film produced by agar-grown flagellated Proteus strains, a film that resembled the mist produced by breath on a glass. Flagellated (swarming, motile) variants were therefore designated H forms (German Hauch, for film, literally breath or mist); nonflagellated (nonswarming, nonmotile) variants growing as isolated colonies and lacking the surface film were designated as O forms (German ohne Hauch, without film [i.e., without surface film of mist droplets]).

References 

Bacteriology